Quch Palang (also Romanized as Qūch Palang) is a village in Rezqabad Rural District, in the Farah Dasht District of Kashmar County, Razavi Khorasan Province, Iran. At the 2006 census, its population was 763, in 178 families.

References 

Populated places in Kashmar County